”It's 2059, and the Rich Kids are Still Winning” is a science fiction short-story by American writer Ted Chiang, initially published on 27 May 2019 by The New York Times as the first installment in a new series, "Op-Eds From the Future".

Plot summary
In the future, scientists conduct an experiment to genetically modify the poor children to improve their intelligence, so they have a better chance to succeed in life. While the experiment proves to be successful and the children really have their IQs pumped up, they still fail to achieve social progress because the entire state system favors the rich only.

Awards
In 2020, the story was a finalist of the Locus Poll Award as Best Short Story.

See also
Inequality for All, a 2013 documentary film directed by Jacob Kornbluth and narrated by Robert Reich. 
The Spirit Level: Why More Equal Societies Almost Always Do Better, a 2009 book by Richard G. Wilkinson and Kate Pickett.

References

External links 
 

Science fiction short stories
2019 short stories
Short stories by Ted Chiang